The 2010 Milwaukee Iron season was the second season for the franchise, and the first in the Arena Football League (AFL), coming from the AF2, which dissolved following the 2009 season. The team was coached by Bob Landsee and played their home games at Bradley Center. For the opening round of the playoffs, the Iron played at U.S. Cellular Arena. The Iron won the Midwest Division to qualify for the playoffs, and defeated the Chicago Rush in the conference semifinals, 64–54. Advancing to the National Conference Championship, their season ended after losing on the road to the top-seeded Spokane Shock, 57–60.

Standings

Regular season schedule
The Iron started their season on the road against the Shock on April 2. Their first home game took place on April 16 against the Barnstormers. The conclusion of their regular season took place in Cleveland against the Gladiators on July 31.

Playoff schedule

All times are EDT

Final roster

Regular season

Week 1: at Spokane Shock

The Iron took down the previous year's ArenaCup champions behind the arm of Chris Greisen. Scoring was scarce in the 1st quarter, with each team putting only a touchdown on the board. In the 2nd quarter, both teams combined for five touchdowns in the final minute before halftime, with the Iron intercepting a pass and returning for a touchdown as time expired, allowing them to take a 34–21 lead. In the 2nd half, the two teams matched one touchdown with another until the 4th quarter when the Shock made it a one-possession game. However a late interception by the Iron, followed by a touchdown on the ensuing drive, sealed the win for them, despite giving up a touchdown to Spokane as time expired.

Chris Greisen threw for 317 yards and 9 touchdowns and did not throw a single interception. Nate Forse was the leading receiver for the Iron with 128 yards and 3 touchdowns.

Week 2: BYE

Week 3: vs. Iowa Barnstormers

Two Midwestern foes found themselves head to head this weekend. The Iowa Barnstormers traveled to Milwaukee, Wisconsin to take on the Iron in their first of two meetings this season. Milwaukee won their home opener in front of the crowd of 5,032 Iron faithful. QB Chris Greisen continued his dominance at the quarterback position, throwing 25-of-36 for 382 yards and seven touchdowns. Greisen has yet to throw an interception this season. While Greisen continues to shine, it is his offensive counterparts that are successful in bringing the ball into the end zone. WRs Nate Forse and Anthony “Tiger” Jones have proven to be Greisen’s perfect receiving duo. Jones brought in three touchdowns on 12 catches for 171 yards this weekend, while Forse made 10 catches for 146 yards and three scores. Greisen’s seventh touchdown was caught by Alvance Robinson. Not to be outdone, Milwaukee’s defense also helped to hold off and Barnstormers serge. Marcus Everett intercepted QB Ryan Vena’s first possession of the game, eventually leading to an Iron score. Milwaukee managed to pull ahead 13–0 before the Barnstormers got into the game. WR Todd Blythe, known for his athletic catches, caught a pass deep in the corner of the end zone to bring the score to 6–13, but Milwaukee would never once trail throughout the game.

Iowa’s QB Vena was intercepted twice, including a game-highlighting play. Milwaukee’s Virgil Gray nabbed an erratic Vena pass in the end zone, not only disrupting a score for the Barnstormers, but also proceeded to run the ball back 58 yards for a score of his own. Despite two players leaving with injuries in the second half, Milwaukee was able to hold off the Barnstormers and come away with the 17-point win.

Week 4: vs. Tampa Bay Storm

Trailing at halftime for the first time in the season by a score of 34–31, the Iron capitalized on Tampa Bay's turnovers to stay undefeated and keep up with the also undefeated Chicago Rush. One key turnover for Milwaukee was a fumble recovery inside their own 5-yard line after the defense had just been flagged for an illegal defense, which gave the Storm an automatic 1st down instead of facing 4th and goal. Following the turnover, quarterback Chris Greisen led the Iron to the end zone by taking it there himself for his first rushing touchdown of the season. Taking an 11-point lead in the 4th quarter, the Iron were ahead for good. Griesen finished with 270 passing yards and 8 total touchdowns. Carlton Brown and Perry Kyles each had an interception on defense.

Week 5: at Alabama Vipers

The Iron suffered their first loss of the season after dropping a close game to the Vipers. After a high-scoring 2nd quarter, Milwaukee led 40–35 at halftime, but after 3 quarters they trailed by just one point. A fumble by Anthony Jones was recovered by the Vipers on the Iron's first drive of the 4th quarter, allowing the Vipers to add to their lead on the ensuing drive. The Iron pulled to within 8 points following an 8-yard receiving touchdown by Jones, but on Alabama's next drive, Larry Shipp scored on a 48-yard rushing play to increase the Vipers' lead to 75–60 with 1:14 left. The Iron put together another touchdown drive ending on a 14-yard pass to Nate Forse with 39 seconds on the clock, but Milwaukee's onside kick attempt was recovered by the Vipers, who ran out the clock to end the game. Chris Greisen completed 33 passes for 360 yards and 9 touchdowns. Nate Forse was the leading receiver for the second consecutive game with 207 yards and 4 touchdowns.

Week 6: vs. Chicago Rush

Though the game was tied 27–27 at halftime, the Iron took control of the game in the 3rd quarter. They scored on the opening drive of the half with a 38-yard touchdown catch by Alvance Robinson. Later, Marcus Everett intercepted a pass and returned it 6 yards for a touchdown. On the ensuing kickoff, Tyre Young stripped the ball from the Chicago returner. Nate Forse recovered the fumble in the end zone for another Iron touchdown. On the Rush's next drive, Marcus Everett picked off a pass with one hand and returned it 46 yards for the score. On the final play of the quarter, Chris Greisen hooked up with Forse for a 20-yard passing touchdown, giving the Iron a 61–34 lead. Milwaukee went on to win the game 71–48, giving Chicago their first loss of the season, and moving the Iron into first place in the Midwest Division. Greisen finished with 339 yards and 5 touchdowns, while Forse caught for 171 yards and 3 touchdowns. Young had 5 carries in the game, two of which were touchdowns.

Week 7: vs. Utah Blaze

In their first ever nationally televised game, it took overtime for the Iron to defeat the blaze. Milwaukee won the overtime coin toss but decided to give Utah the ball first. Utah's Aaron Boone caught his seventh touchdown of the game to give his team a 55–48 lead. Greisen, who threw for 308 yards and six touchdowns, then hit a wide-open Jones in the middle of the field for a 43-yard touchdown to make the score 55–54. Greisen then connected with Nate Forse for the two-point conversion to end the game. Overshadowed in the crazy ending was the fact Milwaukee wide receiver Damian Harrell set the Arena Football League all-time record for career receiving yards. He had six catches for 75 yards to increase his all-time total to 13,398 yards.

Week 8: at Orlando Predators

Orlando quarterback Nick Hill connected with Bobby Sippio for the winning touchdown with four seconds left as the Orlando Predators knocked off the Milwaukee Iron in a game that saw three touchdowns in the final 25 seconds. Hill scored on a two-yard run with 25 seconds left to give the Predators a 51–47 lead. The Iron answered when Chris Greisen hit Tiger Jones for a 35-yard touchdown pass with 14 seconds to play to make it 54–51. But Milwaukee's defense could not hold and Orlando pulled out the victory. Milwaukee receiver Damian Harrell became the AFL's all-time leader for receptions. He entered the game needing seven catches and finished with 13 receptions for a season-high 144 yards and three touchdowns.

Week 9: vs. Dallas Vigilantes

In a battle of the two preseason favorites, Milwaukee quarterback Chris Greisen threw for 295 yards and six touchdowns in a 63–38 blowout of the Vigilantes. The Iron never trailed in Antoine Burns's season debut after returning from the DL. Burns caught eight passes for a team-high 3 touchdowns and 121 yards and filled in nicely for Damian Harrell, who did not play because of a sore hamstring. Nate Forse caught 10 passes for 103 yards and two touchdowns as well.

Week 10: at Arizona Rattlers

Week 11: vs. Cleveland Gladiators

Week 12: at Chicago Rush

Week 13: vs. Spokane Shock

Week 14: at Utah Blaze

Week 15: BYE

Week 16: vs. Orlando Predators

With the win, the Iron clinched a playoff berth.

Week 17: at Iowa Barnstormers

By defeating the Barnstormers and because of a loss by the Chicago Rush in the same week, the Iron clinched the Midwest Division.

Week 18: at Cleveland Gladiators

Playoffs

National Conference Semifinals: vs. Chicago Rush

National Conference Championship: at Spokane Shock

References

Milwaukee Iron
Milwaukee Mustangs (2009–2012) seasons